The Alcudia bridge disaster (Spanish: Catástrofe del Puente de Alcudia) was a train incident in the province of Ciudad Real, Spain, on 27 April 1884. With 59 reported deaths, it became by far the largest train disaster in the country up to that date.

History 
The bridge, inaugurated in 1864, is located at kilometre point 279 of the Madrid–Ciudad Real–Badajoz railway line, between the stations of Chillón and Almadenejos.

The events took place in the early morning of 27 April 1884, at about 04:00 AM, when a locomotive (along several carriages and cages with sheep) derailed off the bridge. The flow of the river was very high compared to its usual modest flow due to rain fallen in previous days.

The disaster brought 59 deaths, 54 of them soldiers of the infantry regiment Castilla and 3 soldiers of the infantry regiment Granada, as well as two civilians. There was 56 injured, who were moved to the hospital of Almadén (those critically injured) and Almadenejos.

The incident report was jointly drafted by engineers employed by the Spanish State and MZA. The experts reported one of the three pillars of the bridge had been cut down, prompting the contemporary press to talk about an alleged premeditated sabotage.

The train drivers were indicted of homicide and injuries, and the trial started in 1885. The sentence cleared both the workers and MZA.

References 
Citations

Bibliography
 
 
 

Derailments in Spain
1880s in rail transport
1884 in Spain
Railway accidents in 1884
History of the province of Ciudad Real
Province of Ciudad Real
April 1884 events